Humber Valley Golf Resort is a public golf course and adjoining conference and events facility located in Little Rapids, which is between the towns of Steady Brook and Pasadena in Newfoundland and Labrador, Canada. It also provides winter chalet style accommodation for visitors to the area.

Humber Valley is a four-season resort which opened in December 2004.

The River Course, which opened in June 2006, was designed by Doug Carrick.

Course 
Humber Valley Golf Resort is an 18-hole championship golf course. This resort including luxury chalets and holiday apartments, as well as a spa, all located in the Humber Valley.

Features 
Humber Valley golf resort is located in the hills of the Humber River Valley at elevations around 400 feet, you can see a panoramic view of the Deer Lake and the Long Range Mountains. This club offers first-class facilities for weddings, golf tournaments, conferences, business meetings, and social events.

Awards
2007: Best New Golf Course in Canada by ScoreGolf magazine
2007: Best New International Course by Golf magazine
2007: Best New Canadian Course, 3rd place, by Golf Digest magazine
2006 & 2007 - Worldwide Resort of the Year 2006 & 2007 by Golf Punk magazine

See also
List of golf courses in Newfoundland and Labrador

References

External links
Humber Valley Resort

Golf clubs and courses in Newfoundland and Labrador
2004 establishments in Newfoundland and Labrador